Nampally Assembly constituency is a constituency of Telangana Legislative Assembly, India. It is one among 15 constituencies in Capital city of Hyderabad. It is part of Secunderabad Lok Sabha constituency.

Jaffar Hussain Meraj of All India Majlis-e-Ittehadul Muslimeen is representing the constituency for the second time.

Extent of the constituency
Nampally was carved out of Asifnagar Assembly constituency before the 2009 elections as per Delimitation Act of 2002.
The Assembly Constituency presently comprises the following neighbourhoods:

Members of Legislative Assembly Shalibanda

Members of Legislative Assembly Nampally

Election results

Telangana Legislative Assembly election, 2018

Telangana Legislative Assembly election, 2014

Andhra Pradesh Legislative Assembly election, 2009

See also
 Nampally
 List of constituencies of Telangana Legislative Assembly

References

Assembly constituencies of Telangana